Lemuel Williams (June 18, 1747 – November 8, 1828) was a United States representative from Massachusetts. Born in Taunton in the Province of Massachusetts Bay, he graduated from Harvard College in 1765, studied law, was admitted to the bar and practiced in Bristol and Worcester Counties. He was town clerk of New Bedford from 1792 to 1800.

Williams was elected as a Federalist to the Sixth, Seventh, and Eighth Congresses, serving from March 4, 1799 to March 3, 1805, and was a member of the Massachusetts House of Representatives in 1806. He resumed the practice of law and died in Acushnet, Massachusetts; interment was in Acushnet Cemetery.

References

1747 births
1828 deaths
Harvard College alumni
Members of the Massachusetts House of Representatives
Federalist Party members of the United States House of Representatives from Massachusetts
People from Taunton, Massachusetts
People from Acushnet, Massachusetts